Mennessis is a commune in the Aisne department in Hauts-de-France in northern France. Mennessis station has rail connections to Saint-Quentin, Amiens, Compiègne and Laon.

Population

See also
Communes of the Aisne department

References

Communes of Aisne
Aisne communes articles needing translation from French Wikipedia